Achatinella elegans is an extinct species of a land snail, gastropod in the family Achatinellidae. It was endemic to Oahu.

Shell description
The dextral or sinistral shell is conically-elongate, solid, plano-convex and margined above with the suture well impressed. The shell has six whorls. The aperture is subovate and the white lip is expanded, unreflected, somewhat contracted in its center and thickened within. The short columella is flat and lightly toothed. The
glossy shell color is alternating light and dark-brown, arranged in longitudinal lines or broad patches. Sometimes with a white sutural band and a
white band on the body whorl.

The height of the shell is 23.1 mm. The width of the shell is 10.3 mm.

References
This article incorporates public domain text (a public domain work of the United States Government) from reference.

†elegans
Extinct gastropods
Molluscs of Hawaii
Endemic fauna of Hawaii
Biota of Oahu
Taxonomy articles created by Polbot
ESA endangered species